Antoine Félix Mathé (May 18, 1808 – March 5, 1882) was a French politician.

Early life
Antoine Félix Mathé was born on May 18, 1808, in Cosne-d'Allier, Auvergne, rural France.

Career
He served as a member of the  Chamber of Deputies from 1848 to 1851. He was far left.

Death
He died on March 5, 1882, in Moulins, Auvergne.

References

1808 births
1882 deaths
People from Allier
Politicians from Auvergne-Rhône-Alpes
The Mountain (1849) politicians
Members of the 1848 Constituent Assembly
Members of the National Legislative Assembly of the French Second Republic